Leonidas (Leon) Alaoglu (March 19, 1914 – August 1981) was a mathematician, known for his result, called Alaoglu's theorem on the weak-star compactness of the closed unit ball in the dual of a normed space, also known as the Banach–Alaoglu theorem.

Life and work 

Alaoglu was born in Red Deer, Alberta to Greek parents. He received his BS in 1936, Master's in 1937, and PhD in 1938 (at the age of 24), all from the University of Chicago. His thesis, written under the direction of Lawrence M. Graves was entitled Weak topologies of normed linear spaces. His doctoral thesis is the source of Alaoglu's theorem. The Bourbaki–Alaoglu theorem is a generalization of this result by Bourbaki to dual topologies.

After some years teaching at Pennsylvania State College, Harvard University and Purdue University, in 1944 he became an operations analyst for the United States Air Force.  In his last position, from 1953 to 1981 he worked as a senior scientist in operations research at the Lockheed Corporation in Burbank, California. In this latter period he wrote numerous research reports, some of them classified.

During the Lockheed years he took an active part in seminars and other mathematical activities at Caltech, UCLA and USC. After his death in 1981 a Leonidas Alaoglu Memorial Lecture Series was established at Caltech. Speakers have included Paul Erdős, Irving Kaplansky, Paul Halmos and Hugh Woodin.

See also 
 Axiom of Choice – The Banach–Alaoglu theorem is not provable from ZF without use of the Axiom of Choice.
 Banach–Alaoglu theorem
 Gelfand representation
 List of functional analysis topics
 Superabundant number – Article explains the 1944 results of Alaoglu and Erdős on this topic
 Tychonoff's theorem
 Weak topology – Leads to the weak-star topology to which the Banach–Alaoglu theorem applies.

Publications 
 Alaoglu, Leonidas (M.S. thesis, U. of Chicago, 1937). "The asymptotic Waring problem for fifth and sixth powers" (24 pages). Advisor: Leonard Eugene Dickson
 Alaoglu, Leonidas (Ph.D. thesis, U. of Chicago, 1938). "Weak topologies of normed linear spaces"  Advisor: Lawrence Graves

References

External links
 

1914 births
1981 deaths
20th-century American mathematicians
Canadian mathematicians
Canadian emigrants to the United States
University of Chicago alumni
Topologists
Functional analysts
Number theorists
Lockheed people